The Jerwood Foundation is an independent grant-making foundation in the United Kingdom. In 1999 the Jerwood Foundation established the Jerwood Charitable Foundation, a registered charity under English law.

History
The Jerwood Foundation was established in 1977 by Alan Grieve for John Jerwood, an international businessman and philanthropist. Since Jerwood's death in 1991 it has been administered by Grieve. The Jerwood Foundation is a patron of the arts.

The Foundation has made strategic capital grants reflecting its support for the arts and education. In 2012 the Foundation placed the Jerwood Collection of 20th and 21st Century works of art in the public domain on display in the Jerwood Gallery in Hastings, but in 2019 the Gallery cut ties with the Foundation amid a funding dispute and the Foundation withdrew its collection while the gallery rebranded to be called Hastings Contemporary (as a venue for temporary exhibitions) though remaining in the building owned by the Jerwood Foundation.

Other capital grants made by the foundation include:

 Jerwood Library: Trinity Hall, Cambridge
 Jerwood Gallery: Natural History Museum, London
 Royal Court Theatre, London
 Jerwood Vanburgh Theatre: RADA, London
 Jerwood Studio: Glyndebourne, East Sussex
 Jerwood Medical Education Centre: Royal College of Physicians, London
 TS John Jerwood: Sea Cadets Association
 Jerwood Hall: LSO St Lukes, London
 Jerwood Centre at Wordsworth Trust, Grasmere
 Jerwood School of Design: Oakham School, Rutland
 Jerwood Kiln Studio: Aldeburgh, Suffolk
 Jerwood Dance House: DanceEast, Ipswich

Prizes
Prizes funded by the Foundation include the Jerwood Award, the Jerwood Drawing Prize, Jerwood Painting Prize and the Jerwood Fiction Uncovered Prize.

The Evelyn Walker Drawing Prize was introduced in 2017, in association with the Evelyn Williams Trust. Worth £10,000, the prize is intended  to support an individual artist with a significant track record to develop and make new drawings for a solo exhibition.

See also
Jerwood Space
Jerwood Sculpture Prize

References

Further reading
 Sturgis, Matthew (2009). Jerwood: The Foundation and the Founders. Norwich: Unicorn Press.

External links
Jerwood Charitable Foundation official website

Charities based in England
Funding bodies in the United Kingdom
Organizations established in 1977